The 2003–04 FA Cup qualifying rounds opened the 123rd season of competition in England for 'The Football Association Challenge Cup' (FA Cup), the world's oldest association football single knockout competition. A total of 644 clubs were accepted for the competition, up 20 from the previous season’s 624.

The large number of clubs entering the tournament from lower down (Levels 5 through 10) in the English football pyramid meant that the competition started with six rounds of preliminary (2) and qualifying (4) knockouts for these non-League teams. South Western Football League was the only level 10 league represented in the Cup, four clubs from the South Western Football League were the lowest-ranked clubs in competition. The 32 winning teams from Fourth qualifying round progressed to the First round proper, where League teams tiered at Levels 3 and 4 entered the competition.

Calendar

Extra preliminary round
Matches played on Saturday/Sunday 23 to 24 August 2003. 130 clubs from Level 8, Level 9 and Level 10 of English football, entered at this stage of the competition, while other 217 clubs from levels 8-10 get a bye to the preliminary round.

Preliminary round
Matches played on weekend of Saturday 30 August 2003. A total of 396 clubs took part in this stage of the competition, including the 65 winners from the Extra preliminary round, 217 clubs from Levels 8-10, who get a bye in the extra preliminary round and 114 entering at this stage from the five divisions at Level 7 of English football. The round featured three clubs from Level 10 (all from the South Western Football League) still in the competition, being the lowest ranked clubs in this round.

First qualifying round
Matches on weekend of Saturday 20 September 2003. A total of 198 clubs took part in this stage of the competition, all having progressed from the Preliminary round. St Blazey from the South Western Football League at Level 10 of English football were the lowest-ranked club to qualify for this round of the competition.

Second qualifying round
Matches played on weekend of Saturday 27 September 2003. A total of 168 clubs took part in this stage of the competition, including the 99 winners from the first qualifying round and 69 Level 6 clubs, from Premier divisions of the Isthmian League, Northern Premier League and Southern Football League, entering at this stage. The round featured eleven clubs from Level 9 still in the competition, being the lowest ranked clubs in this round.

Third qualifying round
Matches played on weekend of Saturday 11 October 2003. A total of 84 clubs took part, all having progressed from the second qualifying round. Ashington, Gedling Town and Shirebrook Town from Level 9 of English football were the lowest-ranked club to qualify for this round of the competition.

Fourth qualifying round
Matches played on weekend of Saturday 25 October 2003. A total of 64 clubs took part, 42 having progressed from the third qualifying round and 22 clubs from Conference Premier, forming Level 5 of English football, entering at this stage. The round featured six clubs from Level 8 still in the competition, being the lowest ranked clubs in this round.

Competition proper
See 2003–04 FA Cup for details of the rounds from the first round proper onwards.

External links
 Football Club History Database: FA Cup 2003–04
 The FA Cup Archive

Qual